Ghulam Hazrat Niazi is an Afghan footballer who plays for Ordu Kabul F.C. and Afghanistan national football team. He wears jersey number 24 and plays as midfielder.

Club career
He currently plays for Ordu Kabul F.C.

International career
Ghulam debuted for Afghanistan national football team in 2010, in a friendly match against Tajikistan. He also represented for Afghanistan in 2014 FIFA World Cup qualification in Palestine which was drawn 1-1.

References
 

Afghan footballers
Living people
Association football midfielders
Year of birth missing (living people)
Afghanistan international footballers